Gavrino is a rural locality (a settlement) in Posyolok Ivanishchi, Gus-Khrustalny District, Vladimir Oblast, Russia. The population was 58 as of 2010.

Geography 
Gavrino is located 40 km north of Gus-Khrustalny (the district's administrative centre) by road. Neklyudovo is the nearest rural locality.

References 

Rural localities in Gus-Khrustalny District